"What's the Point" is a song written by John Engelbert and Oskar Bonde and recorded by Swedish rock group, Johnossi. It was released in January 2010 and peaked at number 20 on the Swedish charts.

Charts

Weekly charts

Year-end charts

Darin version

In 2022, Darin performed the song on Så mycket bättre and released the song shortly after. In a review of his performance ScandiPop said "[Darin] delivered a turbo-charged synthpop cover of Johnossi's 'What's the Point'. A knock-out interpretation of the song, which is quite likely to go down as one of the all time best for both Darin and the show." Culture Fix said "[Darin delivered] a barnstorming version of Johnossi's What’s The Point. It is fabulous high energy banger that Darin delivers with an impressive gusto with the track shining as a comfortable addition to his every expanding back catalogue."

Darin's version peaked at number 8 on the Swedish charts. It was certified gold in Sweden in February 2023.

Charts

Certifications

References

2009 songs
2010 singles
2022 singles
Darin (singer) songs